Patrick MacDonogh (1902–1961) was an Irish poet. He was born in Dublin and educated at Avoca School and Trinity College, Dublin. MacDonogh worked as a teacher and commercial artist before joining the staff of Arthur Guinness Son & Co., where he later held a senior executive post.

He published five books of poetry, including Over the Water (1943) and One Landscape Still (1958).

External links

Patrick MacDonogh; poemhunter
 

1902 births
1961 deaths
People from County Dublin
20th-century Irish poets
20th-century male writers
Irish poets